Silver Surfer is a 1990 scrolling shoot 'em up video game developed by Software Creations and published by Arcadia Systems. The game was released in November 1990 in the United States exclusively for the Nintendo Entertainment System. Silver Surfer is based on the Marvel Comics character Silver Surfer, and is primarily known for its high difficulty and highly praised music.

Gameplay and synopsis 

In Silver Surfer, the player controls the character Silver Surfer through various levels that alternate between a side-scrolling and an overhead perspective.

Each stage is divided into sections. At the end of each section, a mini-boss appears, and the Silver Surfer must shoot the main enemy while many other enemies attack as well. These are the only times where the screen stops scrolling forward. The third and final section contains a super-villain from the comic book series who will take more hits to defeat. The villains featured in the game are Reptyl, Mephisto, Possessor, Fire Lord, and Kylor, the self-proclaimed emperor of the Skrull.

After the first set of levels is complete, Galactus appears and sends Silver Surfer on a final mission into the Magik Domain to collect a "Cosmic Device" from a villain whose identity is less than clear. Despite previous claims, the final boss is actually a giant purple being with a handgun that does not appear to have been in the comics, although the image near the boss's health bar suggests that the main antagonist is X-Men villain Mister Sinister. Once Silver Surfer defeats him, the rest of the Cosmic Device is his; he tells Galactus that no one must have access to it and hides it for safe keeping so it may not fall into the wrong hands.

The game has a password feature that allows a number of upgrades, such as invincibility. The game has cut-scenes between the levels to move the story line ahead, and allows the player to pick the levels in any order, similar to the Mega Man games. The game also features two additional 'quests', the first of which is unlocked by entering a password given to the player upon completing the "Magik Domain" mission.

Silver Surfer is armed with silver pellets that shoot out of his hands to destroy enemies and their projectiles. The player can collect silver spheres that serve as "options", which shoot additional pellets alongside the Silver Surfer. By pressing the B button, the spheres switch position to shoot forward, sideways or backward, while the Silver Surfer continues to fire forward.

There are two other kinds of power-ups: collecting squares with an "F" can make shots gradually stronger to make the shots look like fire pellets. Up to five can be collected before they give bonus points instead. Collecting squares with a "B" will stock screen-clearing bombs, used by pressing the Select button; every life starts with one of these in stock.

When a life is lost, all spheres, firepower, and extra bombs are lost and must be re-obtained.

Reception 

Silver Surfer received mostly mixed reviews. While enthusiastic about the game's presentation, GamePro also noted its intense difficulty: "You'll battle seemingly endless waves of tanks, monsters, mutants, ghosts, bats, and robots. Opponents always attack in groups, most take several hits to destroy, and none of them are slow. Robo-guns and traps are everywhere. And be careful not to crash into the scenery".

The music of the game, however, is highly praised for its composition and technical accomplishments.

Notes

References

External links 
 

1990 video games
North America-exclusive video games
Nintendo Entertainment System games
Nintendo Entertainment System-only games
Horizontally scrolling shooters
Vertically scrolling shooters
Video games based on Marvel Comics
Silver Surfer
Superhero video games
Video games about extraterrestrial life
Video games scored by Tim Follin
Video games set on fictional planets
Video games developed in the United Kingdom